Club Pueyrredón is an Argentine sports club from the Benavídez district of Tigre Partido in Buenos Aires Province. The rugby union senior squad currently plays in Primera División A, the second division of the Unión de Rugby de Buenos Aires (URBA) league system.

The field hockey team plays at Torneo Metropolitano organised by the Buenos Aires Hockey Association (AHBA), and since 2016 have their own artificial turf pitch. The club also has a children football section.

History
On November 1942, Jorge Gutiérrez established "Club Colegial Juan Martín de Pueyrredón", which affiliated to Argentine Rugby Union one year later. The youth divisions of the club began to participate in the UAR competitions. The "Club de Rugby Pueyrredón" was founded on June 11, 1953 by Gutiérrez along with players Carlos Montero, Angel Guastella and Juan Carlos Saavedra. The name paid tribute to Juan Martín de Pueyrredón, an Argentine brigadier general from the 19th century. Pueyrredón's headquarters were located in Bolívar street of Buenos Aires.

In 1956, Pueyrredón won the Segunda División championship promoting to Primera División. In 1961 the club acquired a land in Boulogne, Buenos Aires where the field would be built, after years of playing in lent grounds.

In 2010 Pueyrredón was relegated to the second division, along with Banco Nación.

Since 2015 the Institution has moved to Tigre, Buenos Aires Province. Where they installed the first field hockey pitch, a year later (2016). Nowadays, Pueyrredón is playing in rugby for the 1st Division, Zone A at least till 2019.

References

External links
 

p
P
p
1953 establishments in Argentina